Futebol Clube Ribeira Peixe is a football club that plays in the São Tomé Island League, it was recently promoted after being 2nd in the Third Division and plays in the Second Division for the 2017 season. The team is based in the village of Ribeira Peixe, Caué District in the south of the island of São Tomé, São Tomé and Príncipe.

In the 2009–10 two year season, the club played in the regional First Division. In 2011, they were relegated and in 2012, the club played in the Second Division and at the end of the 2013 season, were relegated and started playing at the lowest Third Division. In 2014, they came back to the Second in 2015 after being in the top two, they were relegated and played for a season in the Third until 2016.  The club currently plays in the Second Division for the 2017 season.

League and cup history

Island championships

See also
List of football clubs in São Tomé and Príncipe

References

Football clubs in São Tomé and Príncipe
São Tomé Island Second Division
Caué District